Ivane is a Georgian masculine given name. It is a cognate of the name John. Notable people with the name include:

Ivane Abazasdze (Georgian: იოანე აბაზასძე), 11th-century Georgian feudal lord, a duke of Kartli under King Bagrat IV of Georgia
Ivane Amilakhvari (1829–1905), Georgian nobleman and a military commander in the Imperial Russian service
Ivane Andronikashvili (Georgian: ივანე ანდრონიკაშვილი) (1798–1868), Georgian noble and general in the Imperial Russian service
Ivane Bagration of Mukhrani (Georgian: ივანე მუხრანბატონი) (1812–1895), Georgian noble and general in the Imperial Russian service
Ivane I, Duke of Kldekari (Georgian: ივანე) (died 1080), 11th-century Georgian general and duke of Kldekari, Argveti, and Orbeti-Samshvilde
Ivane Javakhishvili (Georgian: ივანე ჯავახიშვილი) (1876–1940), Georgian historian
Ivane Kazbegi (Georgian: ივანე ყაზბეგი), Polish-Georgian military officer
Ivane Machabeli (Georgian: ივანე მაჩაბელი) (1854–1898), Georgian writer, journalist and public figure known for his translations of Shakespeare

Masculine given names
Georgian masculine given names